Hutniki  is a settlement in the administrative district of Gmina Drezdenko, within Strzelce-Drezdenko County, Lubusz Voivodeship, in western Poland.

Hutniki is in a wooded area to the east of Dobiegniew, on the west bank of the Drawa River. To the north is the town Stare Osieczno; to the south is the larger settlement of Przeborowo.

References

Hutniki